Bimberamala National Park is a national park in New South Wales, Australia. It is located thirty kilometres west of Batemans Bay and ten kilometres north of Kings Highway. This is a park of steep and wooded landscapes. The Bimberamala River flows through a deeply incised valley, creating a lot of water holes.

Five endangered animal species have found their habitat here.

See also
 Protected areas of New South Wales

References

National parks of New South Wales
2001 establishments in Australia